Uliana Malashenko (Russian: Ульяна Малашенко, born August 24, 1988) is a Russian American broadcast journalist and media writer, specializing in live and investigative reporting, domestic and international politics, and topics of public interest. In the past, Malashenko was a host of the morning news program at TVRain. She moved to the United States in 2014 and presently resides in New York City, New York.

Education and early journalistic career 
Malashenko has a master's degree in journalism from Lomonosov Moscow State University, which she received in 2011. While still a student at MSU, she reported for Expert TV, RBC TV and Kommersant FM. In 2013, she became a news correspondent and host of TV Rain news show, Here and Now. Through the early years of her journalistic career, Uliana faced a lot of pressure from government authorities while covering high-profile political stories. As a result, she was subjected to house visits by local police forces. At another point, while on assignment for Kommersant FM, she was covering the environmentalist protests in Khimki forest. Together with other journalists, she was assaulted by Russian law enforcement agents, resulting in a brain concussion and hospitalization. These and other events ultimately contributed to her decision to relocate and continue her journalistic career in the United States.

In the fall of 2021, Uliana Malashenko graduated from Columbia Journalism School where she specialized in developing beat-specific expertise in national politics, U.S. elections and investigative journalism. Since March 2022, she has been working as a misinformation reporter for Lead Stories, a US-based media company specializing in identifying and debunking false claims on social media.

Current publications and contributions 
Malashenko is a bilingual writer, contributing to several digital media publications, with articles published in English and Russian. She covers significant topics of public interest, ranging from current events such as presidential and mayoral elections in the USA and Russia, to devastation caused by hurricanes Harvey and Irma. She interviewed a NASA official, Bob Jacobs, about space collaboration between the US and Russia, and reported on the 2017 solar eclipse in the US. Her article profiling multiple survivors of the HIV epidemic was published on 2017 World AIDS Day. Throughout 2016 and most of 2017, Malashenko actively participated in Russian historical event project, contributing to Mikhail Zygar's high-profile "Project 1917" which received coverage in online media from CNN and others.

Malashenko presently works with domestic and international online and on-air publications, including Washington Babylon, The National Interest, Snob.ru, Business FM, and Batenka.

References

External links 
Notable articles
 "The Municipal Election in Moscow: Amateur Politicians Against Silence", The National Interest
 "30 ЛЕТ С ВИЧ"
 "Understanding Putin: Why Russia didn’t celebrate the Bolshevik Revolution’s 100th anniversary", Washington Babylon
 "Twenty-Eight Years With HIV-Positive Status: A literary and photo essay", Washington Babylon
 «They call me, Crazy Russian». The story of a Russian-born NYPD cop
 "Special New York City Election Issue: Bullshit campaign promises on subway will go unfulfilled", Washington Babylon
 "5 unknown Russians who left their mark on U.S. history", Russia Direct
 "Украинская «солдат Джейн». Кто такая Надежда Савченко"

1988 births
Living people
Russian political people
Russian writers